The 1997 World Table Tennis Championships men's doubles was the 44th edition of the men's doubles championship.

Kong Linghui and Liu Guoliang won the title after defeating Jörgen Persson and Jan-Ove Waldner in the final by three sets to two.

Results

See also
List of World Table Tennis Championships medalists

References

-